Karl Anderson (born 1980) is an American professional wrestler

Karl Anderson may also refer to:

 Karl Anderson (alpine skier) (born 1953), American former alpine skier
 Karl Anderson (artist) (1874–1956), American artist
 Karl Anderson (athlete) (1900–1989), American track and field athlete
 Karl Ricks Anderson (born 1937), Latter-day Saint historian
 Karl Anderson, Jr., (born 1959), birth name of American fashion designer Michael Kors

See also 
Carl Anderson (disambiguation)